BeGeistert is an annual (formerly semiannual) users' and developers' conference for the open source operating system Haiku.

The conference usually takes place over a weekend in the autumn of each year in Düsseldorf, Germany. The programme typically consists of demonstrations by European software vendors, coding demonstrations, and workshops and presentations on advancements made in developing Haiku.

History 
BeGeistert originally started as a BeOS conference, playing an important part in its community. For example, developers and representatives of Be Europe and other important contributors attended the conference in the late 1990s. This history is reflected in the conference name, as the use of capitalization in the German word "begeistert" (meaning: "excited") alludes to Be Inc., the developer of the BeOS.

After the bankruptcy of Be Inc. caused the BeOS to be discontinued in the early 2000s, the conference was attended by representatives of the two projects deriving from the BeOS: ZETA, a closed source commercial initiative by yellowTAB based on the source code of an unreleased version of the BeOS, and the Haiku project, an initiative to create an open source operating system that is inspired by and compatible with the latest official release of the BeOS. After yellowTAB's insolvency in 2006, the conference's focus shifted entirely to Haiku. In 2007, feathers similar to those in the Haiku logo were added to the BeGeistert logo to reflect this shift.

The conference is organized and partially funded by the Haiku Support Association e.V., formerly BeFAN e.V., and also supported by Haiku, Inc. Between 2004 and 2006, Haiku, Inc. also organized an official annual Haiku conference in various places in the United States under the name "WalterCon", which was discontinued due to a "lack of community interest" for the 2007 conference.

Editions 
In 1998, BeGeistert started as a one-day event, but became a two-day conference since BeGeistert 004, mostly taking place in April and October. As of 2013, the conference is held annually.

Between 2000 and 2008, some conference weekends included coding challenges, which among others resulted in the first localizable version of OpenTracker. Since 2003, it is being organized in the City Youth Hostel in Düsseldorf's Oberkassel neighborhood, except during the youth hostel's reconstruction in 2006. Since 2008, nearly every edition of the conference was either preceded or followed by a coding event, later becoming the Haiku CodeSprint, lasting up to a week.

Each edition of BeGeistert is identified by a three-digit number and a motto that often refers to the current events in the BeOS/Haiku world, such as moving on after the bankruptcy of Be, Inc., or the unveiling of a new (alpha) release of Haiku.

Notes 

1998 establishments in Germany
Annual events in Germany
BeOS
Free-software conferences
Recurring events established in 1998